Henry Madzorera is a Zimbabwean politician who was Minister of Health and Child Welfare from 2009 to 2013. A member of the MDC-T, he has also served as the Senator for Kwekwe.

References

Members of the Senate of Zimbabwe
Living people
Government ministers of Zimbabwe
Movement for Democratic Change – Tsvangirai politicians
Year of birth missing (living people)